Kasumi Glacier is a wide glacier flowing to the sea just east of Kasumi Rock in Queen Maud Land, Antarctica. It was mapped from surveys and air photos by the Japanese Antarctic Research Expedition, 1957–62, who gave the name.

See also
 List of glaciers in the Antarctic
 Glaciology

References

 

Glaciers of Queen Maud Land
Prince Olav Coast